Hutchison Clark (August 29, 1806 – February 17, 1877) was mayor of Hamilton, Ontario, in 1868.

References
 Hutchison Clark at Hamilton Public Library

External links 

1806 births
1877 deaths
Mayors of Hamilton, Ontario